Misha Mengelberg (5 June 1935 – 3 March 2017) was a Dutch jazz pianist and composer. A prominent figure in post-WWII European Jazz, Mengelberg is known for his forays into free improvisation, for bringing humor into his music, and as a leading interpreter of songs by fellow pianists Thelonious Monk and Herbie Nichols.

Biography
Mengelberg was born in Kiev, Ukrainian SSR, the son of the Dutch conductor  (born Karel Willem Joseph Mengelberg; 18 July 1902, Utrecht – 11 July 1984, Amsterdam) and grand-nephew of conductor Willem Mengelberg. Karel Mengelberg was a Dutch composer and conductor, who worked in Berlin, Barcelona, Kiev and Amsterdam. A notable work of his was 'Catalunya Renaixent', written for the Banda Municipal of Barcelona in 1934. 

Misha's family moved back to the Netherlands in the late 1930s and he began learning the piano at age five. Mengelberg briefly studied architecture before entering the Royal Conservatory in The Hague, where he studied music from 1958-64. While there he won the first prize at a jazz festival in Loosdrecht and became associated with Fluxus. His early influences included Thelonious Monk, Duke Ellington and John Cage, whom he heard lecture at Darmstadt.

Mengelberg won the Gaudeamus International Composers Award in 1961. Among his first recordings was one of Eric Dolphy's last, Last Date (1964). Also on that record was the drummer Han Bennink, and the two of them, together with saxophonist Piet Noordijk, formed a quartet which had a number of different bassists, and which played at the Newport Jazz Festival in 1966. In 1967 he co-founded the Instant Composers Pool, an organisation which promoted avant garde Dutch jazz performances and recordings, with Bennink and Willem Breuker. He was co-founder of STEIM in Amsterdam in 1969.

Mengelberg played with a large variety of musicians. He often performed in a duo with fellow Dutchman Bennink, with other collaborators including Derek Bailey, Peter Brötzmann, Evan Parker, Anthony Braxton, and (on the flip side of a live recording with Dolphy) his pet parrot. He was also one of the earliest exponents of the work of the once-neglected pianist Herbie Nichols.

He also wrote music for others to perform (generally leaving some room for improvisation) and oversaw a number of music theatre productions, which usually included a large element of absurdist humour. A 2006 DVD release, Afijn (ICP/Data), is a primer on Mengelberg's life and work, containing an 80-minute documentary and additional concert footage.

Mengelberg died in Amsterdam on 3 March 2017, aged 81, from undisclosed causes.

Discography

Solo albums

 1979: Pech Onderweg (BV Haast)
 1982: Musica Per 17 Instrumenti / 3 Intermezzi /Omtrent Een Componistenactie Composer's Voice
 1994: Impromptus (FMP)
 1997: Misha Mengelberg (I Dischi Di Angelica)
 1997: The Root Of The Problem (hatOLOGY)
 1999: Two Days In Chicago (hatOLOGY)
 2000: Solo (Buzz)
 2005: Senne Sing Song (Tzadik)

Collaborations
As leader
 1978: Groupcomposing (Instant Composers Pool), with Peter Brötzmann, Evan Parker, Peter Bennink, Paul Rutherford, Derek Bailey, and Han Bennink
 1978: Fragments (Instant Composers Pool), with John Tchicai, Han Bennink, and Derek Bailey
 1985: Change of Season (Music of Herbie Nichols) (Soul Note), with Steve Lacy, George E. Lewis, Arjen Gorter, and Han Bennink
 1985: On Escalation / 3 Pianopieces / Dialogue / Summer (Attacca), with Peter Schat, Jan Van Vlijmen, and Otto Ketting
 1991: Dutch Masters (Soul Note), with Steve Lacy, George Lewis, Ernst Reijseger, and Han Bennink
 1994: Who's Bridge (Avant), with Misha Mengelberg Trio (Brad Jones, Joey Baron)
 1997: Live In Holland '97 (X-OR), with Mats Gustafsson and Gert-Jan Prins
 1998: No Idea (DIW), with Misha Mengelberg Trio (Greg Cohen, Joey Baron)
 2001: Four in One (Songlines), with Misha Mengelberg Quartet (Dave Douglas, Brad Jones, Han Bennink)
 2009: Mill (Conundrom), with Cor Fuhler and Michiel Scheen
 2011: It Won't Be Called Broken Chair (Psi), with Evan Parker
 2013: Lucebert / Jazz & Poetry '65 (Uitgeverij Huis Clos), with Misha Mengelberg / Piet Noordijk Kwartet (Han Bennink, Rob Langereis)
 2014: Nunc! (Nemu), with Dirk Bell, Ryan Carniaux, Gerd Dudek, Joscha Oetz, and Nils Tegen

With Eric Dolphy
 1964: Last Date (Fontana), live including with Jacques Schols and Han Bennink
 1974: Playing: Epistrophy, 1 June 1964 In Eindhoven, Holland (Instant Composers Pool), including Schols and Bennink

With Han Bennink
 1968: Instant Composers Pool (Instant Composers Pool), including with John Tchicai
 1971: Instant Composers Pool 010 (Instant Composers Pool)
 1972: Een Mirakelse Tocht Door Het Scharrebroekse no. 1-6 (Instant Composers Pool)
 1974: EinePartieTischtennis (FMP, Instant Composers Pool), live
 1975: Coincidents (Stichting ICP Geluidsdragers, Instant Composers Pool)
 1978: Midwoud 77 (Instant Composers Pool)
 1979: A European Proposal (Live in Cremona) (Horo), including with Paul Rutherford and Mario Schiano
 1982: Bennink Mengelberg (Instant Composers Pool)
 1994: Mix (Instant Composers Pool)
 1996: The Instant Composers Pool 30 Years (Instant Composers Pool)
 1998: MiHa (Instant Composers Pool)
 2004: Senne Sing Song (Tzadik)

With Louis Andriessen
 1969: Reconstructie (STEIM), including with Hugo Claus, Reinbert de Leeuw, Harry Mulisch, Peter Schat and Jan van Vlijmen

With ICP Orchestra
 1979: Live in Soncino (Instant Composers Pool, AD LIB)
 1982: Japan Japon (Instant Composers Pool)
 1984: Extension Red, White & Blue (Instant Composers Pool)
 1987: Two Programs: Performs Herbie Nichols and Thelonious Monk (Instant Composers Pool)
 1990: Bospaadje Konijnehol I (Instant Composers Pool)
 1991: Bospaadje Konijnehol II (Instant Composers Pool)
 1999: Jubilee Varia (hatOLOGY)
 2001: Oh, My Dog (Instant Composers Pool)
 2004: Aan & Uit (Instant Composers Pool)
 2006: Weer Is Een Dag Voorbij (Instant Composers Pool)
 2009: Live at the Bimhuis (Instant Composers Pool)
 2010: !ICP! 50 (Instant Composers Pool)
 2010: ICP Orchestra (Instant Composers Pool)
 2014: East of the Sun (Instant Composers Pool)
 2015: Misha Enzovoort (Instant Composers Pool)
 2016: Restless in Pieces (Instant Composers Pool)
With Anthony Braxton
Anthony Braxton's Charlie Parker Project 1993 (HatART, 1993 [1995])
With Peter Brötzmann
 1979: 3 Points and a Mountain (FMP), including with Han Bennink

With Dudu Pukwana
 1979: Yi Yole (Instant Composers Pool), including with Han Bennink

With Keshavan Maslak
 1980: Humanplexity (Leo), including with Han Bennink

With Roswell Rudd
 1983: Regeneration (Soul Note), including with Steve Lacy, Kent Carter, and Han Bennink

With Pino Minafra
 1987: Tropic of the Mounted Sea Chicken (Splasc(H)), including with Michele Lomuto, Han Bennink, and Unknown Artist
With Franz Koglmann
1991: L'Heure Bleue (HatART) 
With Steve Lacy
 1996: Five Facings (FMP), including with Marilyn Crispell, Ulrich Gumpert, Fred Van Hove, Vladimir Miller

With Yuri Honing
 1998: Playing (Jazz in Motion)
 2000: Lively (Buzz), including with Ernst Reijseger

With Paul Termos
 2003: Termos Sessions Volume I (X-OR, Bimhuis)

With Benjamin Herman
 2004: Heterogenity (X-OR, Bimhuis), featuring Bert Joris

With Alessandra Patrucco
 2006: Circus (Instant Composers Pool), including with Tristan Honsinger, Ab Baars, and Han Bennink

With Frank Gratkowski	
 2006: Frank Gratkowski Vis-à-vis Misha Mengelberg (Leo)

With Ab Baars and Ig Henneman
 2009: Sliptong (Wig 16) 2009, 

With Berlin Contemporary Jazz Orchestra
 Berlin Contemporary Jazz Orchestra (ECM, 1990)

References

External links

1996 Mengelberg interview conducted by Dan Warburton
Discography from the European Free Improvisation Pages
ICP Orchestra Homepage
FMP releases
 
 

1935 births
2017 deaths
Dutch composers
Dutch jazz pianists
Free improvisation pianists
Gaudeamus Composition Competition prize-winners
Soviet emigrants to the Netherlands
Post-bop pianists
Avant-garde jazz pianists
DIW Records artists
Misha
Berlin Contemporary Jazz Orchestra members
ICP Orchestra members
FMP/Free Music Production artists